Yogyakarta Station, commonly known as Tugu Station (abbreviation YK, number 3020) is a railway station located in Yogyakarta, Special Region of Yogyakarta, in Indonesia. The altitude of this station is  amsl.

It is the biggest and most important station in Yogyakarta, located in the heart of the city. This station is adjacent to Jalan Malioboro. The city's other most important station is Lempuyangan railway station.

History
Staatsspoorwegen (SS) was built the railway line from Cilacap towards Yogyakarta as a part of developing Javanese southern line. This station was opened along with opening of the line on 20 July 1887.

A unique fact about this station is, the southern platform was owned by the first company of Javanese railway system, the Nederlandsch-Indische Spoorweg Maatschappij (NIS) with  gauge. The northern part was owned by Staatsspoorwegen (SS) with  gauge. There are two currently abandoned tracks that branched from this station, to Bantul (Palbapang) and Magelang (Secang).

It is currently operated by Kereta Api Indonesia, Regional VI Operation Area of Yogyakarta. This station and its railway tracks stretching from west to east and also as the border of Jetis and Gedongtengen district. 

This station serves the departure and arrival of all commercial classes (executive, business, and non-subsidized economy class) train from Jakarta, Bandung, and Surabaya.

Services
The following is a list of train services at the Yogyakarta Station:

Intercity trains
Executive class
 Taksaka, to 

Executive, Business, and Economy class

Executive and Business class
 Ranggajati, to  via  and 

Executive and Premium Economy class
 Fajar Utama Yogyakarta, to 
 Senja Utama Yogyakarta, to 
 Sancaka, to 
 Mutiara Timur, to 

Executive and Economy Plus class
 Malioboro Express, to 

Premium class

Non-subsidized Economy class
 Joglosemarkerto, loopline through Central Java via ,  and

Commuter rail and airport rail link 
 , to 
 , to

Bus connection 
There are a number of Trans Jogja bus stops nearby the station. Near the southern entrance is a bus stop for Corridor K2-Teman Bus. The Malioboro 1 bus stop located at Malioboro Street serves Line 1A, 2A, 3A, 8, and 10.

References

External links
 

Buildings and structures in Yogyakarta
Railway stations in Yogyakarta
Railway stations opened in 1887